Aberdeen was a burgh constituency of the House of Commons of the Parliament of the United Kingdom from 1832 until 1885. It was represented by one Member of Parliament (MP), elected by the first past the post voting system.

Boundaries

As created in 1832, the constituency covered the burgh of Aberdeen, which was previously within the Aberdeen Burghs constituency. Together with Aberdeenshire, Aberdeen was one of two constituencies covering the county of Aberdeen.

The boundaries of the constituency, as set out in the 1832 Act, were-

"From the Point, on the North-west of the Town, at which the Scatter Burn joins the River Don, down the River Don to the Point at which the same joins the Sea; thence along the Sea Shore to the Point at which the River Dee joins the Sea; thence up the River Dee to a Point which is distant One hundred Yards (measured along the River Dee) above the Bridge of Dee; thence in a straight Line to the Point at which the March between the Parishes of Old Machar and Banchory Davenick crosses the Old-Dee-side Road; thence, Northward, along the March between the Parishes of Old Machar and Banchory Davenick, and Old Machar and Newhills, to the Point first described."

In 1885, the Aberdeen constituency was divided between Aberdeen North and Aberdeen South.

Members of Parliament

Election results

Elections in the 1880s

Elections in the 1870s

 Caused by Sykes' death.

Elections in the 1860s

Elections in the 1850s

Elections in the 1840s

Elections in the 1830s

References

Historic parliamentary constituencies in Scotland (Westminster)
Constituencies of the Parliament of the United Kingdom established in 1832
Constituencies of the Parliament of the United Kingdom disestablished in 1885
Politics of the county of Aberdeen
1832 establishments in Scotland
1885 disestablishments in Scotland